Megan Smallhouse (born January 16, 2001) is an American freestyle skier who competes internationally.

She competed in the FIS Freestyle Ski and Snowboarding World Championships 2021, where she placed seventh in women's aerials.

References

2001 births
Living people
American female freestyle skiers